Double Trouble is a 1992 action comedy film released straight-to-video. It stars the "Barbarian Brothers"—Peter and David Paul—and is directed by John Paragon. Co-stars include Roddy McDowall, David Carradine, Lewis Arquette, Troy Donahue, James Doohan, Collin Bernsen and Bill Mumy.

Plot
Peter Jade earns his living as a crook. During one of his thieving tours, a puzzling circuit board falls into his hands. He soon realizes that there is a counterpart to this plate; with both plates, you are able to open a safe on the international diamond exchange. The leader of a criminal organization, Philip Chamberlain, has taken possession of the other circuit board, also recognizes the connection, and goes in search of its counterpart.

This forces Peter to team up with his twin brother David, a police officer, to stop the criminal organization. Since the twin brothers can hardly be more unequal, there are always differences of opinion between the Jade brothers. They quickly become the target of Chamberlain's global syndicate. Since they are quick-witted, they manage one time at a time to get their pursuers out of the way.

External links

1992 films
1990s crime comedy films
American comedy films
1992 comedy films
1990s English-language films
1990s American films